Nalakath Soopy (born 15 August 1946) is a prominent leader of Indian Union Muslim League (IUML) and former Minister of Kerala.

Biography 
Nalakath Soopy is an LLB degree holder and came to active politics through the Muslim Students Federation. Soopy held high position in the party. He was elected to the Kerala Legislative Assembly for the Perinthalmanna Constituency in 1980 for the first time, and reelected to the Assembly in all General Elections until 2001. He served as the Minister for Education from 2001 to 2004 in the A.K. Antony Ministry.

References

1946 births
Living people
Indian Union Muslim League politicians
People from Malappuram district
Kerala MLAs 1980–1982
Kerala MLAs 1982–1987
Kerala MLAs 1987–1991
Kerala MLAs 1991–1996
Kerala MLAs 1996–2001
Kerala MLAs 2001–2006
Education Ministers of Kerala